Cladopodiella is a genus of liverworts belonging to the family Cephaloziaceae.

The genus was first described by H. Buch.

The genus has almost cosmopolitan distribution.

Species:
 Cladopodiella fluitans
 Cladopodiella francisci (Nees) O.Buch

References

Cephaloziaceae
Jungermanniales genera